The 17th Legislative Assembly of British Columbia sat from 1929 to 1933. The members were elected in the British Columbia general election held in June 1928. The Conservative Party, led by Simon Fraser Tolmie, formed the government.

James William Jones served as speaker for the assembly until his resignation in 1930. Jones was replaced by Cyril Francis Davie.

Members of the 17th General Assembly 
The following members were elected to the assembly in 1928.:

Notes:

Party standings

By-elections 
By-elections were held for the following members appointed to the provincial cabinet, as was required at the time. This requirement was abolished in 1929.
 William Atkinson, Minister of Agriculture, acclaimed October 22, 1928
 Nelson Seymour Lougheed, Minister of Public Works, acclaimed October 22, 1928
 Robert Henry Pooley, Attorney-General, acclaimed October 22, 1928
 Frederick Parker Burden, Minister of Lands, acclaimed October 22, 1928
 Samuel Lyness Howe, Provincial Secretary and Minister of Fisheries, acclaimed October 22, 1928
 Simon Fraser Tolmie, Premier, acclaimed October 22, 1928
 William Alexander McKenzie, Minister of Mines, acclaimed October 22, 1928
 William Curtis Shelly, Minister of Finance, acclaimed October 22, 1928
 Joshua Hinchcliffe, Minister of Education, acclaimed October 22, 1928

By-elections were held to replace members for various other reasons:

Notes:

Other changes 
In 1932 the Independent Labour Party became the Socialist Party.Tom Uphill continues to sit as a Labour member.
Mackenzie (dec. Michael Manson July 11, 1932)

References 

Political history of British Columbia
Terms of British Columbia Parliaments
1929 establishments in British Columbia
1933 disestablishments in British Columbia
20th century in British Columbia